Death of a Vlogger is a 2019 Scottish horror/mystery found footage film, written and directed by Graham Hughes. The film premiered at the 2019 London FrightFest Film Festival.

Plot 
Graham is a vlogger who will do anything for a laugh. He is driven by his social presence online and does it all for the likes. However, Graham's videos are not bringing in the viewership that they once did. One night when Graham is recording, he catches an alleged haunting on camera in his flat. His video goes viral and his viewership and likes seem to be going back up. His audience, however, seem to be torn. Some are calling it fake and others are calling it truly terrifying and genuine.

Graham catches the attention of an online ghost hunter named Steve. Steve suggest they do a live séance in Graham's flat. Along with Graham's partner, Erin, they carry out the séance which reveals a ghostly figure. This video also goes viral. After a few more videos, Graham claims that the videos were fake. This causes Graham's fans to turn on him. His viewership and likes stop. His hauntings however, do not. Now Graham is "crying wolf," trying to get everyone to believe him again. 

Graham, who was once caught up in the limelight and addicted to all the attention is now in a downward spiral and is blurring the lines between reality and fantasy.

The story is told both in found footage style and through interviews. It can be considered a mockumentary.

Cast 
 Graham Hughes as Graham
 Annabel Logan as Erin
 Paddy Kondracki as Steve
 Joma West as Alice
 Stephen Beavis as Ian
 Patrick O'Brien as Dr. Watson
 Joise Rogers as Gabrielle

Reception 
The film has been met with mostly positive reviews from the horror community.

Rafael of slashfilm.com rated this film a 9/10 stating, "A twisted story of warped perceptions, megalomania, the victims in the middle of media manipulation and our own obsession with online cruelty that results in a breath of fresh air in an overcrowded genre." Matt Glasby of Total Film gave the film 4 out of 5 stars stating "Hughes pulls off a real coup with this frightening faux-documentary."

However, Damien Riley from Horrornews.net was more critical of the film, stating: " Unfortunately, if you are looking for “Death of a Vlogger” to be the next great horror mockumentary, I'm afraid you will be let down."

The film was long-listed for a BIFA Discovery Award.

References

External links 
 

British horror films
Paranormal films
2010s mockumentary films
Found footage films
2019 films
2019 horror films
2010s English-language films
2010s British films